Events from the year 1714 in Russia

Incumbents
 Monarch – Peter I

Events

 Order of Saint Catherine
 Kizhi Pogost

Births

Deaths

References

 
Years of the 18th century in Russia